The Francke Foundations (Franckesche Stiftungen), also known as Glauchasche Anstalten were founded in 1695 in Halle, Germany as a Christian, social and educational work by August Hermann Francke 

The Francke Foundations are today a non-profit educational organization housed in a complex of historic buildings.  The Francke Foundations includes three kindergartens, a children’s creativity centre, four schools, a House of Generations, a youth workshop, a bible centre, traditional commercial enterprises, archives, libraries, museums, and university and non-university research facilities. More than 4,000 people learn, teach, work and live in the Francke Foundations.

The Francke Foundations have been on the German proposal list as a UNESCO World Heritage Site since 1999.

History

17th century 
A pastor and professor in Halle, Francke was strongly interested in education reform.  His goals were to establish a school for poor and orphaned children and create a set of religiously motivated schools for each class of society. 

In 1695, after receiving a large cash donation at Easter, Francke established the first institution in the future Francke foundations, a charity school in his vicarage. The children were taught by students from the University.  With the school gaining a strong reputation, local residents started sending their children to this school.

In spring 1695, Francke founded the Paedagogium, a school for higher education for members of nobility and middle class. In 1697, he added a Latin school.

In 1698, thanks to financial assistance from the King of Prussia, Francke started building the Orphanage for boys.  Finished in 1701, it was a lavish building compared to comparable facilities. In the tympanum of the Orphanage, which is decorated with two eagles rising up to the sun, is written (Isaiah 40:31) “But those who wait for the Lord’s help, find renewed strength; they rise up as if they had eagles’ wings, they run without growing weary, they walk without getting tired.” 

Francke Foundations soon gained a reputation as the "New Jerusalem". The Foundations formed a global correspondence network that spread the reform plans of Halle Pietism internationally.

18th century
In the 18th century, Francke Foundations started a publishing house, a book store, a printing office, a pharmacy and a Cabinet of Artefacts and Curiosities. Their revenues funded the Orphanage.  In 1709 a timbered, three-storey house for orphan girls and a girls' school were established. In 1710, Francke built the English house for English and other foreign children living in Halle.  In 1711 another building was built to house a dining hall and a huge and singing hall with a capacity of 2,000 persons.

In 1711, Francke and Carl Hildebrand von Canstein established the Cansteinsche Bibelanstalt (Canstein Bible Institute), the oldest bible institute in Germany. Bibles were in the early 18th century extremely expensive. An invention in letter pressing, and with financial support byvon Canstein, allowed the institute to produce inexpensive Bibles in a large quantities. Until the middle of the 20th century millions of Bibles had been published.

In the following years a number of buildings were built, e.g. the long house (Langes Haus) in 1713, the largest high-timbered five- and six-storey building. It houses today a hall of residents (Evangelisches Konvikt) and a boarding school for students of the Latina. In the upper Lindenhof (linden yard), the Ökonomiegebäude was built in 1747–48 as an administration house. It is, since 1808 the base of the Stadtsingechor, the oldest boys' choir in central Germany.

19th century 
The Francke Foundations underwent decline in the late 18th century. In the early 19th century, August Hermann Niemeyer took over direction of the Foundations, renewing the educational programs and resolving financial issues.

In 1810 the Realschule was built and in 1835 girls' secondary school. The royal paedagogium (Königliches Pädagogium) was rebuilt in 1848,

20th century
Because of the good reputation and its revenues, the Francke Foundations were growing and a new building for Lateinische Hauptschule (Latina) was built. In 1911 more than 3,000 students attended the various schools. During the time of National socialism, Francke Foundations remained as a Christian formed school city. During World War II air raid in March 1945, some Francke Foundation buildings, including the Francke residence and the Latina, were either damaged and destroyed.

In 1946, during the Soviet occupation of East Germany the presidium of the province of Saxony abolished the Francke Foundations and turned over all its assets and buildings to the Martin Luther University Halle-Wittenberg. 

In the 1970s, the northerly Orphanage wall had been demolished to build an elevated road (Hochstraße) to connect Halle with Halle-Neustadt. This elevated road separates the Orphanage Pharmacy from other parts of the Foundations. On the ground of the Foundations, several high rises were built.

After German Reunification in 1990, the Francke Foundations were re-established in September 1991.  With assistance of the federal state of Saxony-Anhalt and private donations, the Francke Foundations building were renovated.

Current situation and activities

Today the Francke Foundations buildingsare almost completely restored and the ensemble has been revived as cultural and scientific, social and educational institution. 

On the grounds of the Francke Foundations there are now besides the institutions owned by the foundation – the Historic Orphanage, the Archives, the Historic Library and three kindergartens, children's creative education center Krokoseum – the Faculty of Theology and the Institute for Education, the Interdisciplinary Research Centres for Enlightenment Studies (Interdisziplinäres Zentrum für die Erforschung der europäischen Aufklärung) and Interdisciplinary Centre for the Studies in Pietism of the Martin Luther University (Interdisziplinäres Zentrum für Pietismusforschung), four schools (Landesgymnasium Latina "August Hermann Francke", Grundschule "August Hermann Francke", Reformschule Maria Montessori, Sekundarschule "August Hermann Francke"), a Protestant Seminary, a social workshop for young people, two church rooms (St. Georgs Kapelle, Orthodoxe Hauskirche zum Heiligen Kreuz) and the German Federal Cultural Foundation (Kulturstiftung des Bundes). .

Cabinet of Artefacts and Curiosities
The Cabinet of Artefacts and Curiosities is considered to be one of Germany’s oldest teaching and research collections. Today the original museum concept of the 18th century has been recreated in its original location in the mansard of the Historic Orphanage. 

Eighteen decorated display cabinets accommodate the collection of around 3,000 naturalia artificialia, including several models. The naturalia are subdivided into stones, plants and the animal kingdom and the artefacts into the fine arts, the art of writing, coins, everyday culture and clothing. 

In the Historic Orphanage several exhibitions about the history of Francke Foundation and related issues were shown. In the former prayer and singing hall, now the Freylinghausen-Saal, events, meetings and concerts take place. In the basement the children’s creative centre Krokoseum offers activities in cultural education.

Library and Study Center

The Historical Library was founded at the end of the 17th century by Francke. The old library's holdings contain around 50,000 books on all areas of knowledge, but particularly on early modern church and educational history. Since 1728 the books have been housed in a purpose-built building whose original library fittings, including the stage-set like shelving, have been preserved in their entirety. From 1996 to 1998 the building was restored according to the old plans; it can now be seen again as it was in 1746. 

The Study Centre is a service institution for the cataloguing of and research into the Archive and Library holdings of the Francke Foundations. In recent years comprehensive and innovative cataloguing projects could be carried out with the financial support of the German Research Foundation. These improve our understanding of the sources and provide a solid basis for new research perspectives and projects. The Fritz Thyssen Fellowship of the Francke Foundations helps scientists to achieve this. Together the Archive and the Library of the Francke Foundations form the Study Centre "August Hermann Francke". Housed in the Historical Library building (House 22) and the neighbouring building (House 23/24).

Orthodox Chapel of the Holy Cross and the Resurrection of Jesus
The Chapel of the Holy Cross and the resurrection of Jesus, installed in the vaults of House 24 in the year 2000, is the only Orthodox Church in Saxony-Anhalt. The walls of the barrel vaults have been painted in accordance with the traditions of Orthodox art. They depict icons of figures from both the Old and New Testaments as well as scenes from biblical history. The iconostases of beech wood were made by a master craftsman from Halle.

The House of Generations
Originally constructed as the royal paedagogium, this building was redeveloped in 2005, as the House of Generations (Haus der Generationen).

It contains a primary Montessori school (Reformschule Maria Montessori), a nursing home (Altenheim der Paul-Riebeck-Stiftung) and a social consulting and education institution for families and health care (Familienkompetenzzentrum für Bildung und Gesundheit).

See also 

 Franckesche Stiftungen
 House of Generations 
 Historical Library 
 Cabinet of Artefacts and Curiosities
Study Centre

References

August Hermann Francke (1704): Der grosse Aufsatz. Schrift über eine Reform des Erziehungs- und Bildungswesens als Ausgangspunkt einer geistlichen und sozialen Neuordnung der Evangelischen Kirche des 18. Jahrhunderts. Mit einer quellenkundlichen Einführung hrsg. v. Otto Podczeck (Abhandlungen der Sächsischen Akademie der Wissenschaften zu Leipzig, Philologisch-Historische Klasse, Bd. 53, H. 3), Akademie-Verlag, Berlin 1962.
Günter Treizel: Kleiner Führer durch die Franckeschen Stiftungen zu Halle. Fliegenkopf-Verlag, Halle 2003, .
Helmut Obst; Paul Raabe: Die Franckeschen Stiftungen zu Halle (Saale). Geschichte und Gegenwart. Fliegenkopf-Verlag, Halle 2000, .
Paul Raabe; Thomas J. Müller-Bahlke (Hrsg.): Das Historische Waisenhaus. Das Hauptgebäude der Franckeschen Stiftungen zu Halle. Halle 2005, .
Thomas J. Müller-Bahlke: Die Wunderkammer. Die Kunst- und Naturalienkammer der Franckeschen Stiftungen zu Halle (Saale). Verlag der Franckeschen Stiftungen, Halle/Saale 1998, .
Peter Menck: Die Erziehung der Jugend zur Ehre Gottes und zum Nutzen des Nächsten. Die Pädagogik August Hermann Franckes. Tübingen 2001, .
Gustav Friedrich Hertzberg: August Hermann Francke und sein hallisches Waisenhaus. Verlag der Buchhandlung des Waisenhauses, Halle a. S. 1898
Kelly Whitmer, The Halle Orphanage as Scientific Community: Observation, Eclecticism and Pietism in the Early Enlightenment. Chicago: the University of Chicago Press, 2015.

Foundations based in Germany
Organizations established in the 1690s
Buildings and structures in Halle (Saale)
Pietism